A forerunner of Hangman Books, the Phyroid press was formed in 1979 by Billy Childish and Sexton Ming, publishing over 30 pamphlets of their poetry.

Book publishing companies of the United Kingdom